Southeast Wisconsin Transit System is a marketing partnership of six public transit agencies covering the Greater Milwaukee Area in the United States. These operators provide local or intercounty commuter service in the counties of Milwaukee, Racine, Kenosha, Ozaukee, Waukesha and Washington. The partnership is not exclusive, each agency or company maintains separate marketing departments and advertising programs. The partnership does not include joint or coordinated operations, interline fares or transfers, coordinated grant or funding, or coordinated expense sharing.

Participating transit services

Milwaukee County Transit System (Milwaukee, Ozaukee, Washington and Waukesha counties)
Waukesha Metro Transit (Waukesha local and Milwaukee commuter service)
Belle Urban System (Racine)
Kenosha Transit (Kenosha)
Washington County Commuter Express (Richfield; commuter service between Milwaukee and Washington counties)
Western Kenosha County Transit (Kenosha, operated by Kenosha County)

External links
 Official website

Bus transportation in Wisconsin
Intermodal transportation authorities in Wisconsin